Stained glass refers to both coloured glass as a material and to works made from it.

Glass 
Stained glass may refer to:

British and Irish stained glass (1811–1918), manufacture took place in early 19th-century Britain
Came glasswork, the process of joining cut pieces of art glass through the use of came strips or foil into picturesque designs in a framework of soldered metal
Medieval stained glass, the coloured and painted glass of medieval Europe from the 10th century to the 16th century
Munich-style stained glass, produced in the Royal Bavarian Stained Glass Manufactory, Munich, in the mid-19th century
Stained glass conservation, refers to the protection and preservation of historic stained glass for present and future generations

Art and entertainment 
Stained glass may also refer to:
Stained Glass (puzzle), a binary determination logic puzzle published by Nikoli

Music 
Stained Glass (band), an American rock group from San Jose, California
Stained Glass Window, a 2003 Mila Mason album
Stained Class, a 1978 Judas Priest album
Stained Glass, a piece by contemporary composer David Gillingham
Stained Glass, Soma Fountains,a 1997 album by the Legendary Pink Dots

Television 
Stained Glass, a South Korean television series produced by SBS in 2004
Stained Glass Windows, American television program about religion broadcast by ABC in 1948 and 1949.

Literature 
Transparent Stained-Glass Windows, the third story in the Labyrinth trilogy of cyberpunk novels written by Russian science fiction writer Sergey Lukyanenko
Stained Glass (novel), a 1978 Blackford Oakes novel by William F. Buckley, Jr.

See also  
Glass
Cathedral glass
Stained-glass ceiling